Barlow Girls may refer to:

 BarlowGirl, a Christian rock all-female band
 "Barlow Girls", a song by Superchick about that band from the album Karaoke Superstars
 Barlow Girls' High School in West Bengal, India